C-STEM Studio  is a platform for hands-on integrated learning of computing, science, technology, engineering, and mathematics (C-STEM) with robotics. It can be used to control multiple Linkbot, Lego Mindstorms NXT and EV3, Arduino boards.

C-STEM Studio is developed by the UC Davis C-STEM Center’s. C-STEM Studio includes the software modules, programs, comprehensive documentation, teacher’s guides, and textbooks used in the C-STEM  curriculum.

C-STEM Studio is specially designed for instructors to organize diverse teaching resources and for students to conduct computer homework assignments conveniently in formal computer teaching labs. C-STEM Studio is provided free of charge.

References

External links 
 C-STEM Center
 C-STEM Studio
 RoboBlockly

University of California
University of California, Davis
American educational websites